Carlos Sánchez Jiménez (born 19 April 2001) is a Spanish footballer who plays as a right back for FC Cartagena B.

Club career
Born in Palma de Mallorca, Balearic Islands, Sánchez played youth football with hometown side RCD Mallorca. On 14 October 2020, after finishing his formation, he signed for Tercera División side CE Andratx.

Sánchez was a regular starter during the season, as his side achieved a first-ever promotion to Segunda División RFEF. On 22 June 2022, after suffering relegation, he moved to FC Cartagena and was initially assigned to the reserves also in the fourth division.

Sánchez made his first team debut for the Efesé on 14 January 2023, starting in a 0–0 Segunda División home draw against SD Huesca.

References

External links

2001 births
Living people
Footballers from Palma de Mallorca
Spanish footballers
Association football defenders
Segunda División players
Segunda Federación players
Tercera División players
FC Cartagena B players
FC Cartagena footballers
CE Andratx footballers